The Presidential Band of the State Security Service of the Republic of Kazakhstan, formerly the Band of the Republican Guard of Kazakhstan, is a military music unit made for state ceremonies carried out by the State Security Service of Kazakhstan.

The band has performed in countries of the CIS, as well as United Kingdom, Italy, United States, Turkey, Austria, Belgium, Malaysia, Egypt, India, Bahrain, Greece and other countries. The band's repertoire includes almost all the international anthems, military marches, folk music, pop music, and classical music foreign and Kazakh composers. The band is under the direction of a bandmaster and senior military director, currently Colonel Talgat Berdigulov since 2006.

Ensembles that belong to the band include the following:

 Brass Band 
 Ceremonial Band
 Symphonic Band
 Folk and Dance ensembles

A member of the brass band carries a Lyre, which serves as the ceremonial symbol of the unit at official ceremonies. The requirements for membership in the band include physical standards such as the ability to run at least 1 mile. During an interview with Kazinform in August 2017, Tlek Ergaliev, the director of the band's brass group, stated that female bandsmen "must be beautiful and slim".

History
The band was formed in accordance with the Decree of the President of Kazakhstan in 1992 to provide the musical part of state, protocol, events and official celebrations. Until 1994, the it was called the Exemplary Band of the Kazakh Armed Forces and from 1994 to 2014 was a part of the Republican Guard. In 1997, the band was relocated to the new capital of Astana from Almaty. In April 2014, when the State Security Service of Kazakhstan was created, the band was rebranded as the Presidential Band. In 1994, a string quartet was formed, with musicians working with it over the years, including Bayan Musakhodjaev, Kairzhan Zholdybaev and Aida Ayupova. In 2006, the chamber music quartet was transformed into a chamber music ensemble. From 1997 to 2000, the Presidential Band included a Big Band Jazz Band under the direction of Honored Art Worker Alexander Ablaev. In 2015, the ensemble was revived under the direction of Suyunbai Kazbaev, a graduate of the Almaty State Conservatory. In 1997, a folk ensemble was created, which would later in 2006 become a laureate of the Daryn State Youth Prize.

Main repertoire
The Presidential Band's primary repertoire includes the following pieces of music:
Meniń Qazaqstanym (national anthem)
Presidential Fanfare
Slow March No. 1
Slow March No. 2
Slow March No. 3
Unknown Signal
Metropolitan March
Jubilee Slow March "25 Years of the Red Army"
March of Ablai Khan
March of Amangeldi İmanov

Notable members
Alexey Kutunov, rector of the Zhurgenov Kazakh National Academy of Arts.
Murat Chalaala, chief conductor of the Astana Symphony Orchestra.
Arystanbek Mukhamediuly, former Minister of Culture and Sports and director of the band from 1997 to 2001.
Galym Akhmedyarov, director of the Astana Opera and a former section leader in the band.

Gallery

See also 
 Central Military Band of the Ministry of Defense of Kazakhstan
 Military Band Service (Kazakhstan)
 Band of the National Guard of the Republic of Kazakhstan
 Presidential Band of the Russian Federation

References

External links 
 Official Website
 ҚР МКҚ Президенттік оркестрінің жаңа концерттік бағдарламасы
 В Нур-Султане готовятся к визиту президента Беларуси

State Security Service of Kazakhstan
Kazakhstani military bands
Military units and formations established in 1992
1992 establishments in Kazakhstan